Terzić is a Bosnian and Serbian surname, derived from the word terzija, meaning "tailor". Notable people with the surname include:

Admir Terzić (born 1992), Bosnian footballer
Adnan Terzić (born 1960), Bosnia and Herzegovina politician
Aleksa Terzić (born 1999), Serbian footballer
Amela Terzić (born 1993), Serbian middle-distance runner
Arvedin Terzić (born 1989), Bosnian footballer
Borislav Terzić (born 1991), Serbian footballer
Dara Terzić Šterić (born 1970), Serbian rhythmic gymnast
Dejan Terzić (born 1987), Serbian sprint canoeist
Edin Terzić (born 1969), Yugoslav alpine skier
Edin Terzić (born 1982), German-Croatian football coach
Jovana Terzić (born 1999), Montenegrin swimmer 
Miloš Terzić (born 1987), Serbian volleyball player
Miloš Terzić (born 1988), Serbian politician
Mirsad Terzić (born 1983), Bosnian handball player
Nikola Terzić (born 2000), Serbian footballer
Petar Terzić (1739-1806), Austrian nobleman and major general
Stefan Terzić (born 1994), Serbian handball player
Velimir Terzić (1908-1983), Yugoslav People's Army captain, partisan general, and historian
Zoran Terzić (born 1966), Serbian volleyball player
Zvezdan Terzić (born 1966), Serbian footballer

Bosnian surnames
Serbian surnames
Occupational surnames